From a Bachelor's Diary (German: Aus dem Tagebuch eines Junggesellen) is a 1929 German silent comedy film directed by Erich Schönfelder and starring Reinhold Schünzel, Leopold von Ledebur and Anton Pointner.

The film's sets were designed by the art directors Gustav A. Knauer and Willy Schiller.

Cast
 Reinhold Schünzel as Franz  
 Leopold von Ledebur as von Wallenstein  
 Anton Pointner as Baron Alfons von Arenhuys  
 Albert Paulig as Herr von Frantz  
 Toni Tetzlaff as Dessen Gattin  
 Henry Bender as August Krause  
 Margarete Kupfer as Amalie, seine Frau  
 Iwa Wanja as Lilli, beider Tochter  
 Grit Haid as Lulu, eine Bardame  
 Carola Höhn as Mieze  
 Ludwig Stössel as Herr von Pollak  
 Max Ralph-Ostermann as Jean

References

Bibliography
 Elsaesser, Thomas. Weimar Cinema and After: Germany's Historical Imaginary. Routledge, 2000.

External links

1929 films
Films of the Weimar Republic
German silent feature films
Films directed by Erich Schönfelder
1929 comedy films
German comedy films
German black-and-white films
Silent comedy films
1920s German films
1920s German-language films